Nuno Miguel Gomes Silva (born 3 August 1997) is a Portuguese professional footballer who plays for Praiense as a goalkeeper.

Club career
He made his LigaPro debut for Mafra on 16 March 2019 in a game against Académico Viseu.

References

External links

1997 births
Living people
Sportspeople from Braga
Portuguese footballers
Portuguese expatriate footballers
Association football goalkeepers
Liga Portugal 2 players
Segunda Divisão players
C.D. Trofense players
C.D. Mafra players
Onisilos Sotira players
S.C. Praiense players
Portuguese expatriate sportspeople in Cyprus
Expatriate footballers in Cyprus